The Essential Collection: 1965–1997 is a box-set compilation album from The Carpenters that, with the exception of a few track changes, is essentially the same as the 1991 From the Top set. Coming in at four discs and 73 songs, this album is one of the biggest of all Carpenters compilation sets. The songs from this box set are everything from the Richard Carpenter Trio recordings from 1965 to their biggest hits in the early 1970s to the last song ever recorded by the Carpenters, "Now".

Track listing
Disc one 1965–1970
"Caravan" (1965)
"The Parting of Our Ways" (1966)
"Looking for Love" (1966)
"I'll Be Yours" (1966)
"Iced Tea" (1966–1967)
"You'll Love Me" (1967)
"All I Can Do" (1967–1968)
"Don't Be Afraid" (1968)
"Invocation" (1968; remix)
"Your Wonderful Parade" (1968)
"All of My Life" (1969; remix)
"Eve" (1969; remix)
"Ticket to Ride" (1969; 1973 remix)
"Get Together" (1970; Your Navy Presents)
"Interview" (1970; Your Navy Presents)
"Love Is Surrender" (1970; remix)
"Maybe It's You" (1970; remix)
"(They Long to Be) Close to You" (1970)
"Mr. Guder" (1970; remix)
"We've Only Just Begun" (1970)
"Merry Christmas Darling" (1970; single version)
"For All We Know" (1970–1971)

Disc two 1971–1973
"Rainy Days and Mondays" (1971; 1985 remix)
"Superstar" (1971)
"Let Me Be the One" (1971)
"Bless the Beasts and Children" (1971; 1991 remix)
"Hurting Each Other" (1972; 1973 remix)
"It's Going to Take Some Time" (1972)
"I Won't Last a Day Without You" (1972)
"A Song for You" (1972; 1987 remix)
"Top of the World" (1972)
"Goodbye to Love" (1972)
"This Masquerade" (1973)
"Sing" (1973)
"Jambalaya (On the Bayou)" (1973)
"Yesterday Once More" (1973)
Oldies Medley (1973)
"Fun, Fun, Fun"
"The End of the World"
"Da Doo Ron Ron"
"Dead Man's Curve"
"Johnny Angel"
"The Night Has a Thousand Eyes"
"Our Day Will Come"
"One Fine Day"
"Yesterday Once More" (Reprise) (1973)
Radio Contest Outtakes (1973)

Disc three 1974–1978
"Morinaga Hi-Crown Chocolate Commercial" (1974)
"Please Mr. Postman" (1974)
"Santa Claus Is Coming to Town" (1974)
"Only Yesterday" (1975)
"Solitaire" (1975)
"Tryin' to Get the Feeling Again" (1975)
"Good Friends Are for Keeps" (1976)
"Ordinary Fool" (1976; released on Voice of the Heart in 1983)
"Sandy" (1976)
"There's a Kind of Hush" (1976)
"I Need to Be in Love" (1976)
"From This Moment On" (1976; Live at the Palladium)
"Suntory Pop – Jingle #1" (1977)
"Suntory Pop – Jingle #2" (1977)
"All You Get from Love Is a Love Song" (1977)
"Calling Occupants of Interplanetary Craft" (1977)
"Sweet, Sweet Smile" (1977)
"Christ Is Born" (1978)
"White Christmas" (1978)
"Little Altar Boy" (1978)
"Ave Maria" (1978)

Disc four 1978–1997
"Where Do I Go from Here?" (1978)
"Little Girl Blue" (1978)
"I Believe You" (1978)
"If I Had You" (1979; Karen Carpenter solo)
"Karen/Ella Medley" (1980; with Ella Fitzgerald)
"This Masquerade"
"My Funny Valentine"
"I'll Be Seeing You"
"Someone to Watch Over Me"
"As Time Goes By"
"Don't Get Around Much Anymore"
"I Let a Song Go Out of My Heart"
1980 Medley
"Sing"
"Knowing When to Leave"
"Make It Easy on Yourself"
"Someday"
"We've Only Just Begun"
"Make Believe It's Your First Time" (1980)
"Touch Me When We're Dancing" (1980)
"When It's Gone (It's Just Gone)" (1980)
"Because We Are in Love (The Wedding Song)" (1980)
"Those Good Old Dreams" (1981)
"Now" (1982)
"Karen's Theme" (1997)

The Carpenters compilation albums
2002 compilation albums